Plastic Ono Band may refer to:

 Plastic Ono Band, the band in its various incarnations
 John Lennon/Plastic Ono Band, the debut solo album by English rock musician John Lennon
 Yoko Ono/Plastic Ono Band, the avant-garde debut album by Yoko Ono